Naomi C. Broering is a medical librarian, elected fellow of the American College of Medical Informatics, and past president of the Medical Library Association. Currently she is Dean of Libraries at the Pacific College of Oriental Medicine.

Education
She received a bachelor's degree in social sciences and a master's degree in history at California State University at Long Beach. Broering went on to receive a master's degree in Library and Information Science, and NIH/NLM Fellowship in medical librarianship and complete all courses toward a doctorate in history at the University of California at Los Angeles (UCLA).

Career
Broering was director of the Dahlgren Memorial Library at Georgetown University School of Medicine from 1978 to 1996. From 1996 to 1997 she served as president of the Medical Library Association, and is reckoned as the first MLA president of Hispanic heritage. She endowed the Naomi C. Broering Hispanic Heritage Grant "on the occasion of her forty-five years as a member of MLA".

She was the 21st editor of the Bulletin of the Medical Library Association. By 1993, her work had contributed to developing computer systems for libraries and to medical information technology.

Honors and awards
MLA fellow 1981
MLA Thomson Scientific/Frank Bradway Rogers Information Advancement Award, 1986
first recipient of the NLM Integrated Advanced Information Management Systems (IAIMS) grant
Fellow, American College of Medical Informatics, 1989
Winifred Sewell Prize for Innovation in Information Technologies from the Special Libraries Association Biomedical & Life Sciences Division, 1999
Marcia C. Noyes Award, 2003

Selected publications
 editor, High-Performance Medical Libraries: Advances in Information Management for the Virtual Era, 
 Broering N. C. "Medical libraries: laws and legislation", (Wedgeworth R, ed. ) ALA world encyclopedia of Iibrary and information services, Chicago, IL: American Library Association, 1980. p, 352.

References

California State University, Long Beach alumni
Year of birth missing (living people)
Living people
American librarians
University of California, Los Angeles alumni
Place of birth missing (living people)
Hispanic and Latino American librarians
American women librarians
Georgetown University faculty
American women academics
21st-century American women